Václav Laurin (16 October 1865, Kamení near Pěnčín – 3 December 1930, Prague) was a Czech engineer, industrialist and automotive pioneer who, along with Václav Klement, founded automobile manufacturer Laurin & Klement that later became today's Škoda Auto.

Career
He apprenticed as a locksmith in Mladá Boleslav, where, in 1895, he and Václav Klement founded the company Laurin & Klement (now Škoda Auto). At the beginning of December 1895, the mechanic Václav Laurin and the book-seller Václav Klement, both bicycle enthusiasts, started manufacturing bicycles of their own design, patriotically named Slavia in the nationalist atmosphere of the end of the 19th century. In 1905, Laurin manufactured their first automobile. Today, the company enjoys worldwide popularity under the brand Škoda Auto.

Laurin was prominently engaged in the automobile company Laurin & Klement, together with his collaborator Václav Klement, co-founder of the company. He participated in the construction of vehicles there. In his later years, he was the technical director of Škoda Auto.

References

External links
 
 

1865 births
20th-century Czech businesspeople
Czech engineers
European founders of automobile manufacturers
Czech automotive pioneers
Škoda people
1930 deaths
19th-century Czech businesspeople